Diwaniya District is a district in Al-Qadisiyyah Governorate, southern Iraq.

Districts of Muthanna Governorate